"(I Would) Die for You" is a song released by Antique, a duo consisting of Helena Paparizou and Nikos Panagiotidis, both born and raised in Sweden by Greek parents. It was the  entry in the Eurovision Song Contest 2001, performed in English and Greek (the first Greek entry not to be performed entirely in Greek).

Prior to entering the contest the group had had two Top 10 hits in both Greece and Sweden, "Opa Opa" and "Dinata Dinata".  "(I Would) Die for You" was released as a CD single by Bonnier Music and EMI International following the contest. The CD single was certified platinum in Greece and gold in Sweden. The song was included on Antique's second album, Die for You, released as Die for You/Tha Pethaina Gia Sena in the Greek market.

Eurovision
The song was performed twenty-second on the night following 's Fabrizio Faniello with "Another Summer Night" and preceding 's Rollo & King with "Never Ever Let You Go".

Lyrically, it deals with the realization on the part of the singers, who sing in unison for most of the performance, that their love is all that matters. They tell each other that "I would die for you/Look into my eyes and see it's true".

The contest performance was a relatively static affair, with both singers as well as the backing vocalists standing in front of microphones to sing. Helena Paparizou, however, wore a tight white outfit, standing out against the black-clad backing singers and her duet partner. While the contest had by this point embraced pre-recorded music, Nikos Panagiotidis performed with the traditional Greek instrument bouzouki throughout.

The third-place finish was Greece's highest place until , when Paparizou, this time performing solo, won the contest with "My Number One".

It was succeeded as Greek representative at the 2002 contest by Michalis Rakintzis with "S.A.G.A.P.O.".

Track listing
Greek release
 "(I Would) Die For You" (English Version) (3:00)
 "(I Would) Die For You" (Eurovision Version) (3:00)
 "(I Would) Die For You" (Greek Version) (3:00)
 "(I Would) Die For You" (Extended Version)

Promo single
 "(I Would) Die For You" (Eric S Radio)
 "(I Would) Die For You" (Die For Disco Radio)
 "(I Would) Die For You" (Nordlight Vs C&N Project)
 "(I Would) Die For You" (BGTH Remix Radio)
 "(I Would) Die For You" (Eric S Club)
 "(I Would) Die For You" (BGTH Remix Extended)
 "(I Would) Die For You" (Die For Disco Instrumental)
 "(I Would) Die For You" (Eurovision Version)
 "(I Would) Die For You" (Extended Version)

Charts

Weekly charts

Year-end charts

Release history

References

Number-one singles in Greece
Eurovision songs of Greece
Eurovision songs of 2001
2001 singles
English-language Greek songs
Macaronic songs
Antique (band) songs
Songs written by Nikos Terzis
2001 songs
Bonnier Music singles
EMI Records singles
V2 Records singles